Oque del Rei is a suburb of the city São Tomé in the nation of São Tomé and Príncipe. Its population is 3,465 (2012 census).

Population history

Sporting club
CD Oque d'El Rei - football (soccer)

References

Populated places in Água Grande District